Bean Mhídhe, Gaelic-Irish female given name.

Bearers of the name

 Bean Mhídhe Ní Mhaoil Seachlainn, died 1137
 Bean Mhídhe Ní Cerbaill, died 1176.
 Bean Mhídhe Ní hEignigh, died 1215.
 Bean Mhídhe Bean Uí Suibhne, died 1269.
 Bean Mhídhe Ní Maghnusa, died 1382.
 Bean Mhídhe Bean Uí Neill Moir, died 1385.
 Bean Mhídhe Ní Glennain, died 1415.
 Bean Mhídhe Ní Conchobair, died 1478.

External links
http://medievalscotland.org/kmo/AnnalsIndex/Feminine/BenMide.shtml

Irish-language feminine given names